Thukran or Thakran is a Yaduvanshi Ahir. gotra found in Haryana , Rajasthan, Delhi, Uttar Pradesh. In Rewari, Nimoth village is of Thukran Yadav's.

References

Gotras
Ahir